Morocco competed in the 2008 Summer Olympics held in Beijing, People's Republic of China from August 8 to August 24, 2008.

Medalists

Archery

Morocco will send an archer to the Olympics for the first time. Fatine Ouadoudi took the top spot at the 2008 African qualifying tournament, earning the nation its first Olympic archery spot.

Athletics

Men
Track & road events

Field events

Women
Track & road events

Boxing

Morocco qualified ten boxers for the Olympic boxing tournament, missing only the light heavyweight class. Rachidi was the only to qualify at the World Championships. Seven more qualified at the first African qualifying tournament. Bouchtouk and Amanissi qualified at the second continental event.

Fencing 

Men

Judo 

Men

Swimming

Women

Taekwondo

See also
 Morocco at the 2008 Summer Paralympics

References

Nations at the 2008 Summer Olympics
2008
Summer Olympics